Fisher-Price is an American company that produces educational toys for infants, toddlers and preschoolers, headquartered in East Aurora, New York. The company was founded in 1930 during the Great Depression by Herman Fisher, Irving Price, Helen Schelle, and Margaret Evans-Price. 

Notable Fisher-Price toys include the Little People toy line, Power Wheels, View-Master, Rescue Heroes, the Chatter Telephone, and the Rock-a-Stack. The company also manufactures a number of products and toys designed for infants. 

Fisher-Price has been a wholly owned subsidiary of Mattel since 1993.

History

Founded in 1930 during the Great Depression by Herman Fisher, Irving Price, Price's illustrator-artist wife Margaret Evans Price, and Helen Schelle, the name Fisher-Price was established by combining two of the three names. Fisher worked previously in manufacturing, selling and advertising games for a company in Churchville, New York. Price had retired from a major variety chain store, and Helen Schelle previously operated Penny Walker Toy Shop in Binghamton, New York. Fisher-Price's fundamental toy-making principles centered on intrinsic play value, ingenuity, strong construction, good value for the money, and action. Early toys were made of heavy steel parts and ponderosa pine, which resisted splintering and held up well to heavy use. The details and charm were added with colorful lithographic labels. Mrs. Price was the first Art Director and designed push-pull toys for the opening line, based on characters from her children's books.

The mayor of Aurora, New York, supported Fisher by raising $100,000 in capital. In 1931, three of the four founders took 16 of their wooden toys to the American International Toy Fair in New York City and they quickly became a success. The first Fisher-Price toy ever sold was "Dr. Doodle" in 1931. In the early 1950s, Fisher-Price identified plastic as a material that could help the company incorporate longer-lasting decorations and brighter colors into its toys. "Buzzy Bee" was the first Fisher-Price toy to make use of plastic. By the end of the 1950s, Fisher-Price manufactured 39 toys incorporating plastics.

During the 1960s, the Play Family (later known as Little People) product line was introduced and soon overtook the popularity of earlier toys. The 'Family House' was one of the more popular Little People playsets. Herman Fisher retired at the age of 71 in 1969 and The Quaker Oats Company bought Fisher-Price the same year.

In 1991, Fisher-Price regained its independence from The Quaker Oats Company and became a publicly traded company. Two years later, in November 1993, Mattel bought Fisher-Price. A new management group set the company's focus on basic, infant and preschool products and began expansion into international markets. By 1997, Mattel decided to market all of its preschool products under the Fisher-Price name.

In 2004, Royal Caribbean Cruise lines launched Fisher-Price Cabanas, play laboratories for children on each of their cruise ships.

Products
Fisher-Price has created approximately 5,000 different toys since the early 1930s. One of Fisher-Price's best-known lines is Little People toys, which includes people and animal figures along with various play sets such as a house, farm, school, garage and vehicles. The figures, which originally were wooden peg-style characters, are now molded of plastic and have detailed features.

In addition to Little People, some of the toys and toy brands that have remained popular for many years include Power Wheels, View-Master, Rescue Heroes, the Chatter Telephone, and the Rock-a-Stack. Other brands marketed under the Fisher-Price name over the years include Disney, Sesame Street, Dora the Explorer, and See 'n Say.

Fisher-Price also designs and sells infant care products and has begun developing electronic toys for preschoolers.

In 2009, Fisher-Price bought all toy rights to Thomas & Friends except for the Wooden Railway line. Through Mattel's 2012 acquisition of HIT Entertainment, which subsequently became a division of Fisher-Price, Mattel now owns the property outright. With this, toys based on Mike the Knight and Bob the Builder have been subsequently released.

Recalls
On August 2, 2007, Fisher-Price recalled close to a million toys, including the Dora the Explorer and Sesame Street toys because of possible hazards due to the toys being coated in lead-based paint.

Rock 'n Play 
Fisher-Price recalled all 4.7 million of their Rock 'n Play sleepers on 12 April 2019, days after the company recalled 250,000 infant soothers. The product was introduced in 2009, and holds the sleeping baby in an inclined position. More than 30 infants have died while sleeping in a Rock 'n Play. The Consumer Product Safety Commission said these deaths occurred "after the infants rolled over while unrestrained, or under other circumstances."

Years before the introduction of the Rock 'n Play sleeper, in the mid-1990s, the American Academy of Pediatrics' Back to Sleep campaign recommended that "babies should not sleep for long periods in inclined devices". In babies under one year old, dying during sleep is the leading cause of accidental death. The recommendation that babies sleep flat on their backs, in an empty crib, has cut this death rate in half.

The Rock 'n Play was designed 15 years after these sleep recommendations were published, and according to a Washington Post article, violated them. Fisher-Price sold the Rock 'n Play without first getting medical advice from more than one pediatric specialist, and without doing any real-world safety tests. They continued to sell it for years after the first deaths were reported.

In January 2023, Fisher-Price re-announced the recall after additional infant deaths were reported.

Current brands and products

 Bright Beats
 EZ Play Railway
 Imaginext (2002–present)
 Laugh & Learn (2000–present)
 Little People (update of the Play Family line) (1959–present)
 Loving Family Dollhouses and accessories
 Mega Bloks (2014–present)
 Power Wheels (1985–present)
 Quizard the Learning Wizard
 Rescue Heroes (1997–present)
 Rainforest Jumparoo
 Smart Toy
 Spinnyos
 Think & Learn

Baby products

 Bassinets
 Soothers & Mobiles
 Entertainers & Activity Centers
 Jumperoos
 High chairs & Booster Seats
 Domes
 Floor Seats
 Tubs & Potties
 Carriers

Historic brands and products

 3rd & Bird related products (2008–2010)
 Adventure People
 Alphabet magnet board
 ALVINNN! and the Chipmunks related products (2015–2020)
 Amazing Animals
 Arthur (Powertouch, Pixter and Easy Link only) (2002–2009) (Moved from Playskool))
 Baby Gymnastics 
 Baby Looney Tunes related products (2002–2004)
 The Backyardigans related products (2004–2012)
 Barbie (Smart Cycle, Pixter, Little People, vehicle toys) (2004–2023)
 Barney related products (2000–2018, and 1993–1999 (Moved from Playskool))
 Bear in the Big Blue House related products (1998–2004)
 The Berenstain Bears related products (1985–1992)
 Between the Lions related products (2000–2002)
 Blaze and the Monster Machines related products (2014–2020)
 Blue's Clues related products (1998–2004, 2007) (moved from Tyco)
 Blue's Room related products (2004–2007)
 Bob the Builder (Original) (Easy Link and Smart Cycle only)
 Bob the Builder (2015 reboot) related products (2015–2022)
 Brilliant Basics
 Butterbean's Cafe related products (2018–2021)
 Chatter Telephone
 Bing related products (Australia and UK only)
 Bubble Guppies related products (2011–2017)
 Cars related products (Shake N Go, Spiral Speedway, and Geotrax only) (2006–2010)
 Cars 2 related products (2011–2017)
 Clifford the Big Red Dog (Powertouch, Computer Cool School, Easy Link, Pixter and View Master only) (2002–2009)
 Cleo & Cuquin related products (Other countries only)
 Construx building toys
 Corn Popper
 The Croods related products (2013–2014)
 Computer Cool School
 Cyberchase (Pixter only) (2002–2006)
 Dance Baby Dance!
 DC League of Super-Pets related products (2022–2023)
 DC Super Friends (Smart Cycle, Trio, Hero World and Imaginext only) (2009–2021)
 Digital Arts And Crafts Studio (2007–2009)
 Disney Princess related products (2002–2006)
 Doodle Pro (changed name from Magna Doodle)
 Dora and Friends related products (2014–2017)
 Dora the Explorer related products (2000–2017)
 Dragon Tales related products (2000–2004) (Moved from Playskool))
 Easy Link Internet Launch Pad (2007–2009)
 ESPN related products (2004–2009)
 The Fairly Oddparents (Powertouch, InteracTV, I Can Play Piano and Pixter only) (2004–2007)
 Favorites of Nick Jr. (2015–2017)
 Fimbles related products (Australia and UK only)
 Finding Nemo (Disney Baby only) (2013–2015)
 Flip Track (replaced in 2002 by GeoTrax, still compatible with GeoTrax)
 FP3 player
 Fun 2 Learn
 Fusion Crew
 GeoTrax (2002–2011)
 Go Diego Go related products (2005–2011)
 Go Jetters related products (Other countries only)
 Guess with Jess related products (2009–2010)
 Handy Manny related products (2006–2013)
 Hero World (2010–2013)
 Higglytown Heroes related products (2006–2009)
 Hot Wheels (Trio, Smart Cycle and Pixter only) (2004–2014)
 I Can Play Guitar
 I Can Play Piano
 InteracTV (2004–2007)
 It's a Big Big World related products (2006–2009)
 iXL (2010–2012)
 Jake and the Never Land Pirates related products (2011–2018)
 Jimmy Neutron (Powertouch, InteracTV, I Can Play Piano, and Pixter only) (2004–2007)
 Jolly Jumping Jack crib toy
 Julius Jr. related products (2013–2017)
 Jungle Junction related products (2009–2012)
 Jurassic World (Imaginext only) (2015–2022)
 Kid Tough Electronics
 Knows Your Name Dolls (Sesame Street, Dora the Explorer, Winnie the Pooh, and SpongeBob SquarePants)
 The Koala Brothers related products (2004–2009)
 Krypto the Superdog related products (2004–2007)
 Kung Fu Panda 2 related products (2011–2012)
 LazyTown related products (2004–2009)
 Learn Through Music (2002–2005)
 Learn Through Music Plus (2005–2007)
 Lightyear (Imaginext only) (2022–2025)
 Little Bill related products (2000–2002)
 Little Einsteins related products (2006–2010)
 Little Mommy (Baby dolls and their various accessories)
 Lunar Jim related products (Australia and UK only)
 Baby Smartronics
 Little Superstar
 Madagascar 3: Europe's Most Wanted related products (2012–2013)
 Mickey Mouse related products (1998–2004)
 Mickey and the Roadster Racers related products (2017–2020)
 Mickey Mouse Clubhouse related products (2006–2017)
 Mike the Knight related products (2011–2017)
 Minions: The Rise of Gru (Imaginext only) (2020–2022)
 Miracles and Milestones
 Monster Jam (Pixter only) (2002–2006)
 Monsters University (Imaginext only) (2013–2015)
 Movie Viewer 
 The Mr. Men Show related products (2009–2010)
 My Friends Tigger & Pooh related products (2007–2011)
 Nickelodeon Knows Your Name (2009–2012)
 My Friend Dolls (Mikey, Becky, etc.)
 Miss Spider's Sunny Patch Friends related products (2004–2009)
 The Muppets related products (1975–2004, including the rare Wild Animal plush)
 Ni Hao, Kai-Lan related products (2007–2013)
 Ocean Wonders
 The Octonauts related products (2012–2017)
 Oreo Matchin Middles Game
 Peek-a-Blocks
 Peppa Pig related products (2013–2017, all moved to Hasbro)
 The Penguins of Madagascar (Smart Cycle and iXL only) (2010–2012)
 Pixter (2000–2007)
 Planes related products (2013–2015)
 Play Family
 Pocket Rockers
 Pop-onz
 Power Rangers (Imaginext only) (2015–2018)
 PowerTouch Learning System
 Puffalumps
 Purr-tenders (1987–88)
 The Puzzle Place related products (1996–1999)
 PXL-2000 camcorder
 Rainbow Rangers related products (2018–2022)
 Read With Me DVD
 Rolie Polie Olie related products (2000–2004)
 Roll-a-Rounds
 Roly Poly
 Santiago of the Seas related products (2020–2022)
 Scooby-Doo (Imaginext, iXL, Smart Cycle, Computer Cool School and Pixter only) (2004–2020)
 Sesame Street related products (1998–2011, (all moved to Hasbro, and 1993–1997 (moved from Tyco))
 Shake 'n Go! (2005–2017)
 Shimmer and Shine related products (2015–2022)
 Shrek Forever After (Smart Cycle and iXL only) (2010–2011)
 Smart Cycle (2007–2017)
 Smart Shopper
 Snap 'n Style Friends & Fashions
 SparkArt Creativity System
 SpongeBob SquarePants related products (2004–2007)
 The SpongeBob Movie: Sponge on the Run (Imaginext only) (2020–2022)
 The SpongeBob Movie: Sponge Out of Water (Imaginext only) (2015–2018)
 Star Station Entertainment System (2004–2007)
 Storybots related products (2018–2020)
 Sunny Day related products (2017–2020)
 Super Why (View Master and Computer Cool School only) (2009–2010)
 Talk-to-Me books with record "discs" built into the pages
 Team Umizoomi related products (2010–2015)
 Teen Titans (Pixter only) (2004–2006)
 Teen Titans Go (Imaginext only) (2017–2020)
 Teenage Mutant Ninja Turtles (Vehicle toys only) (2012–2017) 
 Thomas & Friends (Original) related products (2009–2021, moved from Learning Curve)
 Thomas & Friends: All Engines Go related products (2021–2023)
 Toddlerz
 Toots the Train
 Toy Story 3 related products (2010–2019)
 Toy Story 4 related products (2019–2025)
 Trio (2009–2014)
 VeggieTales related products (1998–2004, moved to Blue Box Toys)
 View-Master (1939–2020)
 View Master Super Sounds (2004–2009)
 Woodsey
 Waybuloo related products (2009; Australia and UK only)
 The Wiggles (Easy Link and View Master only) (2002–2009)
 Winnie the Pooh related products (1998–2007, 2011–2017, 2020–2022)
 Winx Club (Pixter only) (2004–2006)
 Wonder Pets related products (2007–2012)
 Wow! Wow! Wubbzy! related products (2007–2010)
 Yu-Gi-Oh! (Pixter only) (2004–2006)

Video games
Starting in the 1980s, seven games which carried the Fisher-Price name were developed by GameTek for the PC and the Commodore 64. In 1990, three of these titles were ported to the Nintendo Entertainment System:

 Fun Flyer (1984) (never shipped initially, but eventually released in 1990)
 Firehouse Rescue (1988)
 Little People Bowling Alley (1989)
 School Bus Driver (1989)
 My Grand Piano (1989)
 Perfect Fit (1988)
 I Can Remember (1989)

Titles developed by Davidson & Associates include:

 Fisher Price ABC's
 Fisher Price 123's
 Fisher Price Sing Alongs: Barnyard Rhythm and Moos
 Fisher Price Dream Dollhouse
 Great Adventures Castle
 Great Adventures Pirate Ship
 Great Adventures Wild Western Town
 Puddle Books Series
 Learning in Toyland
 Ready for School Toddler
 Ready for School Preschool
 Ready for School Kindergarten
 Ready for School Reading
 Ready for School 1st Grade

Other titles published by Fisher-Price include:
 Great Adventures Pirate Ship (1998)
 Time to Play Pet Shop (1999)
 Big Action Construction (2001)
 Big Action Garage (2001)

Other Fisher-Price products
Other Fisher-Price products include Activegear for families on the go, books, software, car travel accessories, footwear, music, eyeglasses and videos.

References

External links

 
Mattel subsidiaries
Toy brands
Toy companies of the United States
Manufacturing companies based in New York (state)
Companies based in Erie County, New York
American companies established in 1930
Toy companies established in 1930
1930 establishments in New York (state)
1969 mergers and acquisitions
1993 mergers and acquisitions